Sydenstricker School, also known as Pohick School #8 and Upper Pohick Community League Hall (since 1948), is a historic one-room school located at Springfield, Fairfax County, Virginia.  It was built in 1928, and is a one-story, front-gabled structure, covered in weatherboard, painted red with white trim, and topped with a metal roof. Also on the property are a contributing combination storage shed and three-hole privy, the original privy pit, and a large metal flag pole, donated in 1928.

The school building was listed on the National Register of Historic Places in 2012. In 2017 it was commemorated with a historic marker erected on the premises by the Fairfax County Historical Commission.

References

One-room schoolhouses in Virginia
School buildings on the National Register of Historic Places in Virginia
School buildings completed in 1928
Schools in Fairfax County, Virginia
National Register of Historic Places in Fairfax County, Virginia
Springfield, Virginia
1928 establishments in Virginia